James Albert London Baker (born December 9, 1956), nicknamed "Bubba", is a former professional American football defensive end who played in the National Football League (NFL) from 1978 to 1990. He was named to three Pro Bowls and was the NFL Defensive Rookie of the Year.

Professional career
Baker, a graduate of Weequahic High School in Newark, New Jersey and Colorado State University, was drafted in the second round of the 1978 draft by the Detroit Lions. Listed as 6-6 and 250 pounds, he combined speed and strength.

He made his mark early as he recorded 23 sacks (an unofficial stat at that time) his rookie year, with five sacks in a single game against the Tampa Bay Buccaneers. He played for the Lions for five seasons, starting 66 of 67 games. In his last season with the Lions, 1982, when sacks became an official statistic, he totaled 8.5 in only nine games. He also had two career interceptions with the Lions.  During his career with the Lions he unofficially totaled 75.5 sacks including a record 23 sacks in 1978, 16 in 1979, 18 in 1980 and 10 in 1981, which are the franchise's top three all-time, single-season sack efforts. It also ranks as one of the highest for the first five years of a player in football history. He was one of the anchors of the "Silver Rush", Detroit's defensive line  from 1978 to 1982, which consisted of Baker, Doug English, William Gay, and Dave Pureifory; the group set the franchise record for sacks.

A contract dispute had Baker sent to the St. Louis Cardinals in 1983. He had 13 sacks that season along with two interceptions. He had ten sacks the following year, had four in 1985 and then closed out 1986 with 10.5 sacks. In 1987, he was a reserve defense lineman for the Cleveland Browns, then served in the same position in 1988 for the Minnesota Vikings. He returned to the Browns as a starter for all 16 games of the 1989 season as well as for all nine games he played for the Browns in 1990, his final NFL season at age 34.

Baker ranks among the NFL's career sack leaders, with 65.5 official and 131 unofficial sacks to make him one of 62 players in the "100 Sack Club".

Post-NFL career
Baker said in the NFL that he hoped to "play long enough to make a fortune in football. Then my son can be a doctor. He won't have to play this dumb game". Baker now lives with his family, including his wife of 34 years, Sabrina, in Avon, Ohio, a suburb of Cleveland, and he owns a restaurant called Bubba's Q World-famous Bar-B-Que & Catering in Avon. He appeared on the ABC-TV show Shark Tank on December 6, 2013, in which investor and entrepreneur Daymond John agreed to invest $300,000 for a 30 percent share in Queen Ann Inc., the food company he and  his children, Brittani and James, started. Part of the agreement was the licensing of Baker's patent for de-boning pork ribs. Bubba's-Q Boneless Baby Back Ribs have been sold at stores, online, and on QVC, and were featured on Good Morning America.

In 2004, he was picked as the 9th Greatest Pass Rusher in NFL History by Sports Illustrated. In 2007, he was named to the Greater Cleveland Sports Hall of Fame.

In 2021, Baker was listed as the NFL's unofficial all-time single-season sack leader due to Pro Football Reference adding sack statistics from 1960 to 1981, the year before the stat became official. Baker recorded 23 sacks as a rookie in 1978 with the Detroit Lions, topping the official record of 22.5 sacks by Michael Strahan and T. J. Watt.

Awards and honors
Three-time Pro Bowl selection
1978 NFL Defensive Rookie of the Year
Cleveland Sports Hall of Fame (class of 2007)
Six-time Cleveland Magazine Silver Spoon Award winner – Best Restaurant (for Bubba's Q)

References

External links
Al Baker-Legendary Lions
Bubba's Q World Famous Bar-B-Q and Catering
Al "Bubba" Baker: The Unofficial Season Sack Leader

1956 births
Living people
American football defensive ends
Detroit Lions players
St. Louis Cardinals (football) players
Cleveland Browns players
Minnesota Vikings players
National Conference Pro Bowl players
National Football League Defensive Rookie of the Year Award winners
Colorado State Rams football players
Colorado State Rams men's basketball players
Basketball players from Jacksonville, Florida
Players of American football from Jacksonville, Florida
Players of American football from Newark, New Jersey
Weequahic High School alumni
American men's basketball players